The Spanish Legion is a unit of the Spanish army.

Spanish Legion may also refer to:
 Legio IX Hispana, a legion of the ancient Roman army
 Legio VI Hispana, a possible legion of the ancient Roman army

See also
 List of military legions
 List of Roman legions
 Legion (disambiguation)